Hans Werner Schmidt (1859 – 1950) was a German painter, illustrator and etcher. Primarily, he created history paintings, frequently dealing with the history of Weimar and the life of Johann Wolfgang von Goethe.

Grown up as the son of a craftsman, Schmidt began studying at the Weimar Saxon Grand Ducal Art School in 1879. As a student of Albert Heinrich Brendel and Theodor Hagen he became a master student in 1885 and was appointed professor in 1903.

External links
 Hans W. Schmidt at Artnet
 Information about Hans W. Schmidt at auction house Mehlis (in German)

1859 births
1950 deaths
German male painters
German illustrators
19th-century German painters
19th-century German male artists
Artists from Weimar
Artists from Hamburg
History painters